Time Is Over One Day Old is the fourth studio album by Brooklyn-based indie rock band  Bear in Heaven. It was released August 5, 2014 by Dead Oceans.

Track list

References

2014 albums
Bear in Heaven albums
Dead Oceans albums